This Happy Feeling is a 1959 (or 1958) American comedy film directed by Blake Edwards adapted from the F. Hugh Herbert play For Love or Money.

Edwards regretted Universal-International's eleventh hour decision of a name change, but the studio was hoping to trade off another pop hit by Debbie Reynolds as they had with Tammy and the Bachelor. Reynolds stars, along with John Saxon, Curt Jurgens and veteran Hollywood actresses Alexis Smith and Mary Astor.

Plot
Nita Holloway, a woman romantically involved with veteran actor Preston "Mitch" Mitchell, tries to persuade him to come out of retirement to appear in a Broadway play as the father of a character played by a new teen idol, Tony Manza. At his Connecticut farm, next-door neighbor Bill Tremayne asks to borrow Mitch's car. He goes to a party and meets secretary Janet Blake, who is trying to escape the clutches of her drunken boss, a dentist. Bill offers her a ride home in a rainstorm, but is a little too attentive to her liking.

Soaked to the skin, Janet ends up knocking on Mitch's door. He permits her to spend the night while her dress dries. Nita arrives in the morning and mistakenly concludes an affair is taking place, and soon others assume the same. Mitch puts her on a train but also offers Janet a job as his own secretary. As the train leaves, he stumbles, injuring his back.

Bill isn't worried at first because Mitch is too austere and somber for her, however he comes to realize that she's coming to care for him profoundly and is indeed falling dearly in love with Mitch a little more every day. Scheduled to ride Mitch's star horse in an equine contest, Bill jealously decides to ride another entry instead. Mitch must compete against him, bad back and all.

Although he feels great affection towards her, Mitch ultimately realizes that he feels for Nita most. He goes to Nita to reveal where his heart really lies, and is last seen on stage in the new Broadway play.

Cast 
Debbie Reynolds: Janet Blake
Curd Jürgens: Preston Mitchell
John Saxon: Bill Tremaine
Alexis Smith: Nita Hollaway
Mary Astor: Mrs. Tremaine
Estelle Winwood: Mrs. Early
Troy Donahue: Tony Manza
Hayden Rorke: Mr. Booth
Gloria Holden: Mrs. Dover
Alex Gerry: Mr. Dover
Joe Flynn: Dr. McCafferty

Production 
John Saxon was cast after his success in Rock, Pretty Baby.

Reception 
Variety called it "a delightful comedy".

See also 
 List of American films of 1959

References

External links 
 
 
 

1959 films
1959 romantic comedy films
American films based on plays
American romantic comedy films
Films directed by Blake Edwards
Films produced by Ross Hunter
Films scored by Frank Skinner
Films set in Connecticut
Universal Pictures films
Films with screenplays by Blake Edwards
1950s English-language films
1950s American films